James Arthur Haslam III (born March 9, 1954) is an American businessman and sports executive. He is the chairman of the board of the Pilot Flying J truck stop chain. He and his wife Dee own the Cleveland Browns of the National Football League (NFL), the Columbus Crew of Major League Soccer (MLS), and a stake in the Milwaukee Bucks of the National Basketball Association (NBA). His father Jim Haslam founded the Pilot Corporation in 1958 as the Pilot Oil Corporation.

Personal life
Haslam, who lives in his native Knoxville, Tennessee, is the elder brother of Bill Haslam, former Governor of Tennessee. He is married to Susan "Dee" Bagwell Haslam, CEO of RIVR Media, part of the family ownership group of Pilot and co-owner of the Browns and Crew. They have three adult children, James Bagwell Haslam (adopted 2016), Whitney Haslam Johnson, and Cynthia Haslam Arnholt and five grandchildren.

While attending the University of Tennessee, Haslam was a roommate of Bob Corker, who went on to become a United States Senator from Tennessee. He is a member of the Sigma Chi fraternity.

Pilot Flying J
Haslam began his career at Pilot Corporation in 1976. In 1980, Haslam was named vice president of sales, development and operations. At that time, Pilot operated 100 convenience stores with annual fuel sales of about 125 million gallons. Pilot opened its first travel center in 1981, and by 1996 – the same year Haslam was named president and chief executive officer – the company operated 96 travel centers and 50 convenience stores and its total gallon sales had reached 1.2 billion. Pilot Corporation attained yet another milestone in 2001 when it joined with Marathon Ashland Petroleum LLC to form Pilot Travel Centers LLC.

In 2008, Pilot Corporation announced that CVC Capital Partners had acquired 49.8% interest in Pilot Travel Centers LLC, facilitating the sale by Marathon Petroleum Company (formerly Marathon Ashland Petroleum) of its interest in Pilot Travel Centers. Pilot Corporation retained 50% ownership of Pilot Travel Centers LLC. 
In 2015, the Haslam family acquired all of CVC Capital Partners’ shares in the company. Pilot’s convenience store operations continue to be fully owned by Pilot Corporation.
In 2010, Pilot Travel Centers LLC joined with Flying J Inc. In 2012, Pilot Flying J acquired Western Petroleum and the majority ownership of Maxum Petroleum and in 2012 formed Maxum Enterprises LLC, d/b/a Pilot Logistics Services. In 2014, Pilot Logistics Services merged with Thomas Petroleum to form Pilot Thomas Logistics. Pilot Flying J subsidiary Pilot Thomas Logistics is one of the fastest growing energy logistics companies in North America.

Pilot Flying J is one of the largest top 10 privately held companies in the United States and employs more than 24,000 employees. The Pilot Flying J network provides customers with access to more than 70,000 parking spaces for trucks, 4,800 showers and 4,300 diesel lanes featuring DEF at the pump.

In April 2013, the Federal Bureau of Investigation executed a search warrant and affidavit detailing a five-year fraud scheme by the Pilot Flying J chain. The company paid restitution to customers and agreed to pay a $92 million penalty pursuant to a Criminal Enforcement Agreement.

Community involvement
Haslam's civic involvement includes service on the board of directors of Anderson Media Corporation. He also has served on the boards of the United Way of Greater Knoxville, Lakeshore Park in Knoxville and the National Association of Truck Stop Operators (NATSO). In addition, Haslam served as honorary chair of the Boys & Girls Clubs of Cleveland campaign committee and as campaign chair for Knox Area Rescue Ministries and United Way of Greater Knoxville.

In 2006, he served as Tennessee statewide campaign chair for the United States Senator Bob Corker and in 2012, he served as Statewide Finance Chairman for Tennessee Governor Bill Haslam, his brother. Haslam was inducted into the Junior Achievement of East Tennessee Business Hall of Fame in 2007, and in 2010, he was named a recipient of the Ernst & Young Entrepreneur Of The Year award for the Southeast region. In 2013, the University of Tennessee recognized Haslam with the Distinguished Alumnus Award. He is the co-founder of the Haslam Scholars Program for premier honor students at the University of Tennessee.

Sports ownership

NFL
Haslam bought a minority interest in the Pittsburgh Steelers in 2008. In 2012, he reached an agreement with Browns owner Randy Lerner to purchase the franchise for $1 billion. The Browns were valued at $977 million in 2011 by Forbes magazine, 20th in the NFL. NFL rules prohibit ownership in multiple teams and so Haslam sold his interest in the Steelers. The Haslams' purchase of the Browns was unanimously approved by the 32 teams in the NFL on October 12; the sale itself closed thirteen days later.

Since officially taking over the Browns seven games into the 2012 season, and through the end of the 2020 regular season, Haslam has a 44-94-1 record as team owner (including going 0-16 in 2017), but had his first winning season in 2020 when the Browns went 11-5, and won his first postseason game as Browns owner when they defeated the Steelers 48-37 in the Wild Card round of the 2020–21 NFL playoffs.

MLS
In late 2018, reports emerged that Haslam had purchased Major League Soccer club Columbus Crew from Anthony Precourt, who wanted to move the club to Austin, Texas. Haslam, along with his wife Dee and former team physician Pete Edwards, took over as owners on January 1, 2019, as a deal to purchase the club from Precourt was finalized.

The Crew won the MLS Cup 2020, giving Haslam his first major sports championship as an owner.

Awards and honors
Sports ownership
 MLS Cup 2020 (as co-owner of the Columbus Crew)

Business
Junior Achievement of East Tennessee Business Hall of Fame (class of 2007)
Significant Sig Award from the Sigma Chi Foundation
2010 Ernst & Young Entrepreneur of the Year Award
2011 University of Tennessee College of Business Administration's Distinguished Alumni Award

Previous directorial works
 University of Tennessee Athletics
 Innovation Valley, Inc.
 First Horizon Corporation
 Clayton Family Foundation
 Federal Reserve Board Energy Advisory Council
 National Association of Convenience Stores Leadership Council
 Cleveland Clinic

References

External links
 Forbes profile

 
1954 births
Living people
American billionaires
American chief executives of professional sports organizations
University of Tennessee alumni
People from Bratenahl, Ohio
People from Knoxville, Tennessee
Businesspeople from Tennessee
American retail chief executives
Tennessee Republicans
Cleveland Browns owners